Miles Davis and Horns (PRLP 7025) is a compilation album by jazz trumpeter Miles Davis, released by Prestige Records in 1956.

It compiles material from different albums previously released by Prestige in the discontinued 10 inch LP format. The fifth, sixth, and eighth tracks were originally issued on the various artists album Modern Jazz Trumpets (PRLP 113), and had also been issued as 78rpm singles. Tracks 1–4 first appeared on Miles Davis Plays The Compositions Of Al Cohn (PRLP 154). Track 3 was also previously released as the B-side of the "Morpheus" single (Prestige 734). Track 7 was originally on Blue Period (PRLP 140).

The cover art was designed by MAD magazine cartoonist Don Martin, who created several album covers for Prestige before beginning his career with MAD.

12" LP track listing 

PRLP7025:

An alternate take of "Blue Room" was later added as a bonus track.

Personnel 

Tracks 1–4:
 Miles Davis – Trumpet
 Zoot Sims – Tenor Saxophone
 Al Cohn – Tenor Saxophone
 Sonny Truitt – Trombone (plays on "Floppy" only)
 John Lewis – Piano
 Leonard Gaskin – Bass
 Kenny Clarke – Drums

Tracks 5–8:
 Miles Davis – Trumpet
 Sonny Rollins – Tenor Saxophone
 Bennie Green – Trombone
 John Lewis – Piano
 Percy Heath – Bass
 Roy Haynes – Drums

References 

1956 compilation albums
Miles Davis albums
Albums produced by Bob Weinstock
Albums produced by Ira Gitler
Prestige Records compilation albums